Events in the year 1994 in Gabon.

Incumbents 

 President: Omar Bongo Ondimba
 Prime Minister: Casimir Oyé-Mba (until 2 November), Paulin Obame-Nguema (from 2 November)

Events 

 The Common Movement for Development was founded by Paul Biyoghé Mba.

Deaths

References 

 
1990s in Gabon
Years of the 20th century in Gabon
Gabon